Kristijan Krajček (born 1 October 1993) is a Croatian footballer currently playing as a midfielder for Singapore Premier League club Hougang United. He is top assist provider for Hougang United in the 2022 Singapore Premier League.

Career

NK HASK
He being his career with NK HASK when he was 17,after starting his football journey in an academy which is a 20mins drive from where he stays.

Hougang United
Having just join the club at the beginning of the year, he assist the club to win their first ever Singapore Cup.

Career statistics

Club

Honours
Hougang United
Singapore Cup: 2022

References

1993 births
Living people
Footballers from Osijek
Association football midfielders
Croatian footballers
NK HAŠK players
NK BSK Bijelo Brdo players
NK Hrvatski Dragovoljac players
NK Marsonia players
NK Brežice 1919 players
Balestier Khalsa FC players
Hougang United FC players
First Football League (Croatia) players
Slovenian Second League players
Singapore Premier League players
Croatian expatriate footballers
Croatian expatriate sportspeople in Slovenia
Expatriate footballers in Slovenia
Croatian expatriate sportspeople in Singapore
Expatriate footballers in Singapore